KLE Technological University, formerly known as B. V. Bhoomaraddi College of Engineering and Technology (BVBCET), colloquially the BVB College, is a private university in Hubli-Dharwad, Karnataka, India. It was upgraded to a university under the KLE Technological University Act, 2012. The school was founded by the KLE Society, Belgaum, in 1947.

History 

KLE Technological University (formerly BVBCET) was established by the Karnatak Lingayat Education Society (KLE Society) in 1947. It owes its original name to the businessman-philanthropist Shri Basappa Veerappa Bhoomaraddi. It began as a polytechnic in Gadag but shifted to Hubli in 1948 and upgraded itself to a college. Until 1972, it offered only diploma and undergraduate degree programs. Later, it offered 12 undergraduate programs and eight postgraduate programs besides research programs in seven disciplines. It was affiliated to the Visvesvaraya Technological University, Belagavi and its undergraduate programs were accredited by the National Board of Accreditation (NBA) of the All India Council for Technical Education.

Current annual student intake for Undergraduate & Post Graduate programmes is in excess of 1200.

Academics
The university offers 8 undergraduate programs, 7 postgraduate programs and research programs in seven disciplines.

Undergraduate programs 
 School of Mechanical Engineering
 School of Civil Engineering
 School of Computer Science and Engineering - SoCSE
 School of Electronics & Communication Engineering - SoECE

Incubation Centres

Centre for Technology Innovation and Entrepreneurship - CTIE 
Centre for Technology Innovation and Entrepreneurship - CTIE, at BVB Campus, KLE Technological University, was established in 2012 and has been providing space, mentorship, technical support and access to labs for tech start-ups through the incubation model.

CTIE works closely with the Centre for Innovation and Product Development (CIPD) as a feeder of commercializable technology ideas. CIPD has a vision to promote product development competency in engineering students. It ensures multi disciplinary approach to connect to students from various engineering and business streams to work together.

VLSI/ ESDM Incubation Centre 
Hubballi got a unique facility when the VLSI/ ESDM incubation centre to promote startups in this sector was opened at the KLE Tech Park at KLE Technological University (KLETU) on July 17, 2018.

Karnataka Biotechnology & Information Technology Services (KBITS), Indian Electronics & Semiconductors Association (IESA) and KLETU have come together to develop this facility to support entrepreneurs in the emerging sector of VLSI/ ESDM (Very Large Scale Integration/ Electronics System Design and Manufacturing). IT-BT, Science & Technology and Large & Medium Industries Minister K J George inaugurated the centre on July 17, 2018. IT-BT Department Principal Secretary Gaurav Gupta, IESA Working President Anilkumar M, KLETU Vice Chancellor Ashok Shettar, Deshpande Foundation founder Gururaj Deshpande, Deshpande Foundation CEO Vivek Pawar, KLE Society director Shankaranna Munavalli and others were present.

Industry linkages 

 Sankalp Semiconductor has a branch office within the university premises and works with the Electronics and Communications Department.
 Navya Biological has a Process Development Centre within the university premises and works with the Biotechnology Department.
 IBM Software Centre of Excellence has created a group with the aim of improving the technical skills of the students.
 Bosch Center of Competence for Automation Technologies is in the campus.
 Altair Engineering India has partnered with KLE Technological University to set up the Altair Design Innovation Center (ADIC) at the KLE Technological University Hubli campus.
 Samsung has set up Student Ecosystem for Engineered Data (SEED) Lab for artificial intelligence (AI), machine learning (ML), and data engineering at the KLE Technological University, Hubli.

Rankings

The National Institutional Ranking Framework (NIRF) ranked it 180 among engineering colleges in 2021.

The University got a 'Band A' (Rank Between 6th – 25th) rating from the Atal Ranking of Institutions Innovation Achievement (ARIIA).

Campus 

Notable alumni
Basavaraj Bommai
 Gopal Gaonkar
 Sudha Murthy
 S. R. Hiremath
 Vivek Kulkarni
 Anil Sahasrabudhe

References

External links 

 
 KLE-CTIE

Private universities in India
Universities and colleges in Hubli-Dharwad
Universities in Karnataka
2013 establishments in Karnataka
Educational institutions established in 2013